Bruce Alan Larson (August 12, 1926 – April 13, 2021) was an American basketball coach. He was coach of the Arizona Wildcats from 1961 to 1972. Prior to his time at Arizona, Larson served as coach at Eastern Arizona and Weber College (now Weber State). At Weber, his team won the 1959 Junior college national championship.

References

1926 births
2021 deaths
American men's basketball coaches
American men's basketball players
Arizona Wildcats baseball players
Arizona Wildcats men's basketball coaches
Arizona Wildcats men's basketball players
Basketball coaches from North Dakota
Basketball players from North Dakota
College men's basketball head coaches in the United States
Eastern Arizona Gila Monsters men's basketball coaches
Sportspeople from Fargo, North Dakota
Weber State Wildcats men's basketball coaches